The Horsemen's Voice (THV) is an independent, privately owned magazine founded in 1982 by Sallie Pennybacker as the newsletter for the New Mexico Horse Council, in New Mexico, USA.  She published the magazine for 17 years.

THV grew beyond the New Mexico Horse Council and became a magazine.  For a time during 2000–2004 there was an additional, online newsletter, but this caused confusion, with many newsletter subscribers thinking the newsletter and magazine were one and the same.  The magazine's tag line has varied, including "New Mexico's All Breed, All Discipline horse magazine" and "New Mexico's Horse Magazine".  Color printing of the cover and some pages was introduced in 2006.  An important part of the magazine is its free calendar of events, often listing 6–8 events on a given weekend.

History
Owners:
Sallie Pennybacker, founding–1999
Nancy Gage and Jay Koch, 2000–2004
Catherine Logan-Carrillo, 2004–current

References

External links
The Horsemen's Voice
New Mexico Horse Council

1982 establishments in New Mexico
Equestrian organizations
Equine magazines
Horses in the United States
Magazines established in 1982
Magazines published in New Mexico
Newsletters
Sports magazines published in the United States